In atomic physics, even-even (EE) nuclei are nuclei with an even number of neutrons and an even number of protons. Even-mass-number nuclei, which comprise 151/252 = ~ 60% of all stable nuclei, are bosons, i.e. they have integer spin. The vast majority of them, 146 out of 151, belong to the EE class; they have spin 0 because of pairing effects.

References

Bosons
Atomic physics
Subatomic particles with spin 0